Petre Dumitru  (born 11 November 1957) is a retired Romanian weightlifter. He competed at the 1980 and 1984 Olympics and won a silver medal in 1984.

References

1957 births
Living people
Olympic weightlifters of Romania
Weightlifters at the 1984 Summer Olympics
Weightlifters at the 1980 Summer Olympics
Olympic silver medalists for Romania
Olympic medalists in weightlifting
Medalists at the 1984 Summer Olympics
Romanian male weightlifters
20th-century Romanian people